Dee-Ann Kentish-Rogers (born 13 January 1993) is a British-Anguillan politician and the Minister for Education and Social Development of Anguilla. She has been a model, beauty pageant titleholder and athlete. She was crowned as Miss Universe Great Britain 2018 and represented Great Britain at the Miss Universe 2018 pageant, placing in the Top 20 of that competition. Rogers became the first black woman to represent Great Britain at a Miss Universe pageant. In February 2022 she was the acting premier of Anguilla for ten days.

Biography

Kentish-Rogers is a graduate of Law from the University of Birmingham. As well as being a beauty queen and a barrister, she is also an accomplished athlete, having competed in the 2014 Commonwealth Games. She was a heptathlete and ran in the 400 metres in India in 2010 and competed in the heptathlon in Scotland in 2014. She was a pentathlon bronze medallist at the 2012 CARIFTA Games in Hamilton, Bermuda.

On 29 June 2020 Kentish-Rogers was elected to the Anguilla House Of Assembly, defeating incumbent Premier Victor Banks for the Valley South seat. Kentish-Rogers is a member of the Anguilla Progressive Movement, which won a majority in the House Of Assembly. She was appointed Anguilla Minister of Education and Social Development.

Kentish-Rogers has Anguillan heritage and spends her time between the UK and the British Overseas Territory in the Caribbean. The Anguilla Tourist Board has been one of her major sponsors.

In February 2022, Kentish-Rogers served as acting premier of Anguilla for ten days while the Premier, Ellis Webster, was not on the island.

References

External links
Official website, MissUniverseGB.

1993 births
Living people
Anguillan female athletes
Anguillan politicians
British female models
Miss Universe 2018 contestants
Alumni of the University of Birmingham
People from The Valley, Anguilla
Anguillan women in politics
Members of the House of Assembly of Anguilla
21st-century British women politicians
Anguilla Progressive Movement politicians
Commonwealth Games competitors for Anguilla
Athletes (track and field) at the 2010 Commonwealth Games
Athletes (track and field) at the 2014 Commonwealth Games
Women government ministers in the United Kingdom